is a Japanese former handball player. She competed in the 1976 Summer Olympics.

References

1954 births
Living people
Japanese female handball players
Olympic handball players of Japan
Handball players at the 1976 Summer Olympics
21st-century Japanese women
20th-century Japanese women